Jarogo Waterfall also known as Jarogo Banda Waterfall is a waterfall located in Matta Tehsil in Swat District of Khyber Pakhtunkhwa the Province of Pakistan. It is also known as the highest waterfall of Pakistan.

Etymology
The word Jarogo means broom in Pashto but its history goes back to the ancient times of the Hindu Shahi period in Swat. There was a Hindu woman named Jarogai, who was widely known and esteemed in the surrounding areas, so the people named it after her.

See also
Shingrai Waterfall
Swat Valley
List of waterfalls of Pakistan

References 

Waterfalls of Pakistan
Tourist attractions in Khyber Pakhtunkhwa
Tourist attractions in Swat
Swat District